The 1984 London Marathon was the fourth running of the annual marathon race in London, United Kingdom, which took place on Sunday, 13 May. The elite men's race was won by home athlete Charlie Spedding in a time of 2:09:57 hours, and the women's race was won by Norway's Ingrid Kristiansen in 2:24:26.

In the wheelchair races, Irish athletes Kevin Breen (2:38:40) and Kay McShane (3:10:04) set course records in the men's and women's divisions, respectively.

Around 70,000 people applied to enter the race, of which 21,142 had their applications accepted and 16,992 started the race. A total of 15,675 runners finished the race.

Results

Men

Women

Wheelchair men

Wheelchair women

References

Results
Results. Association of Road Racing Statisticians. Retrieved 2020-04-24.

External links

Official website

1984
London Marathon
Marathon
London Marathon